Ihar Viktaravich Makarau (born 20 July 1979 in Kimry, Russian SFSR, Soviet Union), also commonly known by the Russian spelling Igor Viktorovich Makarov, is a Belarusian judoka. He won the gold medal in the half-heavyweight (100 kg) division at the 2004 Summer Olympics.

Achievements

References

External links

 
 
 
 

1979 births
Living people
People from Kimry
Belarusian male judoka
Judoka at the 2004 Summer Olympics
Judoka at the 2012 Summer Olympics
Olympic judoka of Belarus
Olympic gold medalists for Belarus
Olympic medalists in judo
Medalists at the 2004 Summer Olympics
Universiade medalists in judo
Universiade bronze medalists for Belarus